Arline Belle Nichols Moss (1876–1945) of St. Louis, Missouri, was the chairwoman of the committee of the Daughters of the American Revolution who conceptually conceived the Madonna of the Trail monuments.

Biography
Arline Belle Nichols was born in St. Louis on December 24, 1876. She taught at the St. Louis Day School for the Deaf for six years, before moving to her own private teaching studio.

She married John Trigg Moss in June 1901, and they had two children.

Mrs. Moss visualized a statue similar to one she had seen in Oregon of Sacagawea, the Shoshone woman who guided Lewis and Clark on their search for a water route to the Pacific Ocean. She sought out sculptor August Leimbach to create the monuments.

The Madonna of the Trail monuments were dedicated in 12 states in 1928 and 1929.

Moss died at her home in St. Louis on December 26, 1945, and was buried at Bellefontaine Cemetery.

References

External links
 

1876 births
1945 deaths
Burials at Bellefontaine Cemetery
Daughters of the American Revolution people
Educators of the deaf
People from St. Louis